Didymoceras is an extinct genus of ammonite cephalopod from the Late Cretaceous epoch (approximately 76 Ma). It is one of the most bizarrely shaped genera, with a shell that spirals upwards into a loose, hooked tip. It is thought to have drifted in the water vertically, moving up and down. The generic name is Greek for "paired horns".

Its taxonomic place is often in flux, being placed in either Turrilitidae, Nostoceratidae, or its own family, Didymoceratidae. Species included in the genus are the following:

Didymoceras angulatum (Meek and Hayden, 1860) 
Didymoceras binodosum Kennedy and Cobban, 1993 
Didymoceras californicum Anderson, 1958 
Didymoceras cheyenense (Meek and Hayden, 1856) 
Didymoceras cheyennense (Meek and Hayden, 1856) 
Didymoceras cochleatus (Meek and Hayden, 1858) 
Didymoceras hidakense Shigeta in Shigeta et al., 2016 
Didymoceras hornbyense (Whiteaves, 1876) 
Didymoceras navarroensis (Shumard, 1861) 
Didymoceras nebrascense  Meek and Hayden, 1856) 
Didymoceras newtoni (Whitfield, 1877) 
Didymoceras nicolletii (Hall and Meek, 1856) 
Didymoceras platycostatum Kennedy and Cobban, 1993 
Didymoceras stevensoni (Whitfield, 1877) 
Didymoceras subtuberculatum Howarth, 1965 
Didymoceras tenuicostatus (Meek and Hayden, 1858) 
Didymoceras tortus (Meek and Hayden, 1858) 
Didymoceras tricostatus (Whitfield, 1897) 
Didymoceras umbilicatu (Meek and Hayden, 1858) 
Didymoceras uncus (Meek and Hayden, 1858) 
Didymoceras vespertinus (Conrad, 1874)

References

Ammonitida genera
Nostoceratidae
Cretaceous ammonites
Late Cretaceous ammonites of North America
Taxa named by Alpheus Hyatt